Euproctidion is a genus of moths in the subfamily Lymantriinae. The genus was erected by William Jacob Holland in 1893.

Species
Euproctidion conradti Collenette, 1931 Cameroon
Euproctidion convexa (Hering, 1927) Cameroon
Euproctidion gabunica Holland, 1893 Gabon
Euproctidion pallida (Holland, 1893) western Africa
Euproctidion periblepta Collenette, 1954 Congo
Euproctidion rhodobaphes Collenette, 1931 Zimbabwe
Euproctidion rhodoides Collenette, 1931 Zimbabwe
Euproctidion striata Collenette, 1931 Malawi
Euproctidion uniformis (Hering, 1927) Niger

References

Lymantriinae
Noctuoidea genera